Magnus Samuelsson (born 15 April 1972) is a retired Swedish football midfielder.

References

1972 births
Living people
Swedish footballers
IFK Norrköping players
FK Haugesund players
IF Elfsborg players
Association football midfielders
Swedish expatriate footballers
Expatriate footballers in Norway
Swedish expatriate sportspeople in Norway
Allsvenskan players
Superettan players
Eliteserien players
Norwegian First Division players